Westwater may refer to:
Westwater, Utah, a small Navajo Nation-owned community in San Juan County
Westwater Canyon on the Colorado River in Eastern Utah
Westwater Reservoir, Scotland